Maximilian "Max" von der Groeben (born 15 January 1992) is a German actor. 
His father Alexander von der Groeben is a former judoka, sports journalist and also an actor. His mother Ulrike von der Groeben  is also a sports journalist. He has one Sister, Caroline, who also works as an actress.

Selected filmography

References

External links 

1992 births
Living people
German male film actors
Actors from Cologne